Denmark–Estonia relations refers to the historical and current diplomatic relations between Denmark and Estonia. Denmark has an embassy in Tallinn, while Estonia has an embassy in Copenhagen. Denmark recognized and established diplomatic relations with Estonia on 5 February 1921. Relations were renewed on 24 August 1991 with Denmark never having recognized Soviet occupation of the country.

Both countries are members of the European Union, NATO and the Nordic-Baltic Eight. Estonian Prime Minister Jüri Ratas described Denmark as a close friend in 2020 and Denmark moreover has a military presence in Estonia.

History

Danish Estonia (13th–17th century) 

Danish Estonia refers to the territories of present-day Estonia that were ruled by Denmark firstly during the 13th–14th centuries and again during the 16th–17th centuries. Denmark rose as a great military and mercantile power in the 12th century. It had an interest to end the occasional Estonian and Couronian pirate attacks that threatened its Baltic trade. Danish fleets attacked Estonia in 1170, 1194, and 1197. In 1206, King Valdemar II and archbishop Andreas Sunonis led a raid on Ösel island, Saaremaa. The Kings of Denmark laid a claim on Estonia as their possession, which was recognised by the pope. In 1219 the Danish fleet landed in the major harbor of Estonia and defeated the Estonians in the Battle of Lindanise that brought Northern Estonia under Danish reign until the Estonian uprising in 1343, when the territories were taken over by the Teutonic Order and sold by Denmark in 1346.

Early relations with Estonia (1918–1921)
About 200 Danish volunteers took part in the Estonian War of Independence from 1918 to 1920 comprising the Danish-Baltic Auxiliary Corps led by Danish officer Borgelin. In 1918, Estonian statesman Jaan Tõnisson travelled to Denmark to head the Estonian Foreign Delegation. The Estonian Foreign Delegation situated in Copenhagen was the headquarter for Estonia to seek international recognition from other countries. On 5 February 1921, diplomatic relations were established with Flemming Lerche appointed envoy to Estonia with residence in Helsinki. The next year J.C. Johansen was appointed consul general in Tallinn. Johansen was the only foreign diplomatic envoy in Tallinn during the Estonian Independence War. Economically, relations were minimal as Estonia was reorganizing much of its industries and the Land Reform of 1919 only made the two countries competitors on the international agricultural market. In 1926, Estonia picked Ernst Carlsen as general consul in Copenhagen while a couple of consulates were opened all around the city.

On 18 December 1926, both countries established a conciliation commission. On 13 May 1930, an agreement on reciprocity was signed.

Relations with Soviet Estonia (1940–1991) 
Denmark never recognized the Soviet occupation of Estonia. The Estonian government in exile was maintained by its foreign minister in-exile and representative to Denmark August Koern.

After the Soviet occupation of Estonia, Moscow ordered all diplomats abroad to return. However, after consultations with Germany, Denmark refrained from ordering Koern to leave which imitated the policy of the Germans. However, Denmark meticulously began a policy of removing all traces of the Baltic countries in the country, including ordering telecommunications companies to remove all Baltic diplomatic and consular representations from their telephone books. From 1941 to 1952, many Estonian refugees fled to Denmark. From 1945 to 1964, Denmark and the Soviet Union held difficult negotiations on compensation for the Danes who had their properties in Estonia due to nationalization policies. The Soviet Union urged Denmark to publicly admit that Estonia was part of Soviet sovereignty, concessions which Danish politicians would not give. Nonetheless, at a meeting with Andrey Vyshinsky, Danish negotiator Frants Hvass failed at expressing the Danish stance unambiguously which the Russians believed was sufficient enough. Ultimately, the two countries signed an agreement in February 1964 wherein the Soviets would pay Denmark 2.6 million DKK as compensation. Initially, the Danish demanded 20 million DKK.

Official contacts between Denmark and Soviet Estonia were minimal until the Singing Revolution which culminated with Danish Foreign Minister Uffe Ellemann-Jensen signing an agreement with his Estonian counterpart Lennart Meri on renewing diplomatic relations, on 24 August 1991.

Modern relations 
In the 1990s, Denmark pursued a policy which aimed at incorporating Estonia into the European Union, NATO and Council of Europe. From 1992 to 2003, the total Danish assistance to Estonia amounted to 147 million euro for defense, environment and fishing. Support to integrate the Russian minority also had a high priority.

Defense assistance 
In the 1990s, Denmark assisted Estonia in building a national defense and moreover supported the creation of the Baltic Defence College with Danish Michael H. Clemmesen becoming the first Brigadier general of the college in February 1999 until 2004. The two countries signed their first defense agreement in March 1994. Prior to deployment as part of SFOR, the Estonian peace-keeping unit and reconnaissance unit received training in Denmark. The reconnaissance unit went on to serve under the Danish battalion in KFOR in Kosovo. After Estonia joined NATO in 2004, Denmark focused the Brigade Project aiming at preparing Estonian officers to lead a brigade. In 2009, the 1st Infantry Brigade of Estonia was tied to the Danish Division in training. Estonia moreover supported Danish troops in Afghanistan as part of ISAF.

From 2020 to 2021, 200 Danish soldiers were deployed to Tapa Army Base as part of the NATO Enhanced Forward Presence. From 2022 to 2023, a deployment of around Danish 200 soldiers is planned as well.

Environmental assistance (1991–2003) 

From 1991 to 2001, Denmark aided Estonia with 31.8 million DKK for different environmental projects in an effort to support Estonia in fulfilling the environmental criteria on EU-membership. Projects included forest conservation, waste-related projects and assistance for the implementation of the Aarhus Convention. In 2002, an additional 21.7 million DKK was granted for 8 projects as the environmental assistance phased out same year.

Cultural relations 
The two countries have not signed any cultural cooperation agreements albeit having close relations on the matter. Many exchange projects have been conducted between Danish and Estonian municipalities and the Danish Cultural Institute had an office in Tallinn from 1990 to 2013.

High-ranking visits 
Estonian President Lennart Meri visited Denmark in 1994, Arnold Rüütel in 2004, Toomas Hendrik Ilves in 2007, 2011, 2012 and 2015 and Kersti Kaljulaid in 2017.

Conversely, Danish Prime Minister Poul Nyrup Rasmussen visited Estonia in 2000, Anders Fogh Rasmussen in 2005, 2008 and 2009, Helle Thorning-Schmidt in 2011, Lars Løkke Rasmussen in 2018 and Mette Frederiksen in 2020 and again in 2022.

Royal visits 
Queen Margrethe II visited Estonia in 2001 and 2019. The unofficial visit in 2001 was to the former Danish-controlled Saaremaa hosted by President Lennart Meri. Crown Princess Mary visited Estonia in 2014.

Trade 
The following table shows the annual trade numbers between the two countries from 1992 to 2020 in euro:

See also 
 Baltic Air Policing
 Toompea Castle
 Operation Saber Strike
 Accession of Estonia to the European Union

Notes

Bibliography

 

 
Estonia
Denmark